The Pansy Stakes was an American Thoroughbred horse race run annually for twenty-one years from 1890 through 1910 at Sheepshead Bay Race Track at Sheepshead Bay, New York. Open to two-year-olds under selling conditions it was raced over a distance of six furlongs and, not very common at the time, on turf.

Historical notes
The inaugural running of the Pansy Stakes took place on Friday, June 20, 1890. Sent off at 10-1 betting odds, Congressman William L. Scott's Vagabond upset the 2-1 favorite Lord Harry who would finish fourth.

Winged Foot, the 1896 winner, was owned, trained and ridden by John McCafferty.

The final edition of the Pansy Stakes was run on July 1, 1910 and was won by Peter Wimmer's filly Imprint.

The End of a Race and of a Racetrack
Passage of the 1908 Hart–Agnew anti-betting legislation by the New York Legislature under Republican Governor Charles Evans Hughes led to a compete shutdown of racing in 1911 and 1912 in the state. The owners of Sheepshead Bay Race Track, and other racing facilities in New York State, struggled to stay in business without income from betting. Racetrack operators had no choice but to drastically reduce the purse money being paid out which resulted in the Pansy Stakes offering a purse in 1908 that was nearly 80% less than what it had been in earlier years. These small purses made horse racing unprofitable and impossible for even the most successful horse owners to continue in business. As such, for the 1910 racing season management of the Sheepshead Bay facility dropped some of its minor stakes races and used the purse money to bolster this turf race along with its most important events. A February 21, 1913 ruling by the New York Supreme Court, Appellate Division saw horse racing return in 1913. However, it was too late for the Sheepshead Bay horse racing facility and it never reopened.

Records
Speed record:
 1:12 4/5 @ 6 furlongs : Ethereal (1908)

Most wins by a jockey:
 No jockey won this race more than once.

Most wins by a trainer: (based on current info)
 2 – John J. Hyland (1891, 1908)
 2 – William P. Burch (1899, 1902)

Most wins by an owner:
 No owner won this race more than once.

Winners

References

Discontinued horse races in New York City
Flat horse races for two-year-olds
Open sprint category horse races
Turf races in the United States
Sheepshead Bay Race Track
Recurring sporting events established in 1890
Recurring sporting events disestablished in 1910